Philosophers (and others important in the history of philosophy), listed alphabetically:

Note: This list has a minimal criterion for inclusion and the relevance to philosophy of some individuals on the list is disputed.

A
 Nicola Abbagnano (1901–1990)
 Muhammad Abduh (1849–1905)
 Peter Abelard (1079–1142)
 Miguel Abensour (1939–2017)
 Abhinavagupta (fl. c. 975–1025)
 Abner of Burgos (c. 1270 – c. 1347)
 Isaac ben Judah Abravanel (1437–1508)
 Judah ben Isaac Abravanel (1460?–1535?)
 Marilyn McCord Adams (1943–2017)
 Robert Adams (born 1937)
 Jane Addams (1860–1935)
 Joseph Addison (1672–1719)
 Adelard of Bath (12th century)
 Alfred Adler (1870–1937)
 Theodor Adorno (1903–1969)
 Aenesidemus (1st century BC)
 Jamal al-Din al-Afghani (1839–1897)
 Rodolphus Agricola (1443–1485)
 Agrippa the Sceptic (1st/2nd century)
 Heinrich Cornelius Agrippa (1486–1535)
 Pierre d'Ailly (1350–1420)
 Kazimierz Ajdukiewicz (1890–1963)
 Isaac Albalag (13th century)
 Hans Albert (born 1921)
 Albert of Saxony (c. 1316–1390)
 Albertus Magnus (or Saint Albert the Great or Albert of Cologne), (1193?–1280)
 Joseph Albo (1380–1444)
 Alcinous (2nd century)
 Alcmaeon of Croton (5th century BC)
 Virgil Aldrich (1903–1998)
 Yohanan ben Isaac Alemanno (1433–1504)
 Alexander of Aphrodisias (2nd century)
 Alexander of Hales (died 1245)
 Samuel Alexander (1859–1938)
 Dante Alighieri (1265–1321)
 Antonio Aliotta (1881–1964)
 Archibald Alison (1757–1839)
 Abd al-Jabiri (1935—2010)
 Abdullah al-Qasemi (1907–1996)
 William Alston (1921–2009)
 Johannes Althusius (1557–1638)
 Louis Althusser (1918–1990)
 Robert Alyngton (died 1398)
 B. R. Ambedkar (1891–1956)
 Ambrose (c. 340–397)
 Abu'l Hasan Muhammad Ibn Yusuf al-'Amiri (died 992)
 Ammonius Hermiae (5th century)
 Ammonius Saccas (3rd century)
 André-Marie Ampère (1775–1836)
 Anton Wilhelm Amo (1703–c. 1759)
 Anaxagoras (died 462 BC)
 Anaxarchus (fl. 340 BC)
 Anaximander (c. 610 BC–c. 546 BC)
 Anaximenes of Miletus (6th century BC)
 Alan Ross Anderson (1925–1973)
 John Anderson (1893–1962)
 Ando Shoeki (1703–1762)
 Andronicus of Rhodes (c. 70 BC)
 Peter Annet (1693–1769)
 Anniceris (fl. 300 BC)
 G. E. M. Anscombe (1918–2001)
 Anselm (1034–1109)
 Antiochus of Ascalon (c. 130–68 BC)
 Antiphon (480–403 BC)
 Antisthenes (c. 444–365)
 Karl-Otto Apel (1922–2017)
 Apuleius (c. 123–c. 180)
 Thomas Aquinas (1225–1274)
 Isaac ben Moses Arama (1420–1494)
 Arcesilaus (316–241 BC)
 Archytas (428–347 BC)
 Roberto Ardigò (1828–1920)
 Hannah Arendt (1906–1975)
 Aristippus of Cyrene (c. 435–366 BC)
 Aristo of Chios (fl. 250 BC)
 Aristotle (384 BC – 322 BC)
 Arius (256–336)
 Mohammed Arkoun (1928–2010)
 Jacobus Arminius (1560–1609)
 David Malet Armstrong (1926–2014)
 Antoine Arnauld (1612–1694)
 Matthew Arnold (1822–1888)
 Kenneth Arrow (1921–2017)
 Valentin Ferdinandovich Asmus (1894–1975)
 Mary Astell (1666–1731)
 Athanasius of Alexandria (298–373)
 Pandurang Shastri Athavale (1920–2003)
 Gwenaëlle Aubry (born 1971)
 Augustine of Hippo (354–430)
 Marcus Aurelius (121–180)
 Peter Aureol (c. 1280–1322)
 Sri Aurobindo (1872–1950)
 John Austin (1790–1859)
 John Langshaw Austin (1911–1960)
 Richard Avenarius (1843–1896)
 Averroes (or Ibn Rushd), (1126–1198)
 Avicenna (or Ibn Sina), (980–1037)
 Lyubov Axelrod (1868–1946)
 Alfred Jules Ayer (1910–1989)

B
 Franz Xaver von Baader (1765–1841)
 Charles Babbage (1791–1871)
 Gaston Bachelard (1884–1962)
 Johann Jakob Bachofen (1815–1887)
 Francis Bacon (1561–1626)
 Roger Bacon (1214–1294)
 Alain Badiou (born 1937) 
 Hibat Allah Abu'l-Barakat al-Baghdaadi (1080–1165)
 Abd al-Latif al-Baghdadi (1162–1231)
 Sergio Bagú (1911–2002)
 Annette Baier (1929–2012)
 Kurt Baier (1917–2010)
 Alexander Bain (1818–1903)
 Karl Friedrich Bahrdt (1741–1792)
 Lynne Rudder Baker (1944–2017)
 Mikhail Bakhtin (1895–1975)
 Mikhail Bakunin (1814–1876)
 Arthur Balfour (1848–1930)
 John Balguy (1686–1748)
 Étienne Balibar (born 1942)
 Domingo Báñez (1528–1604)
 Antonio Banfi (1886–1957)
 Abraham bar Hiyya Ha-Nasi (1070–1136)
 Jonathan Barnes (born 1942)
 Brian Barry (1936–2009)
 Karl Barth (1886–1968)
 Roland Barthes (1915–1980)
 Bartolus de Saxoferrato (1313–1357)
 Johann Bernhard Basedow (1724–1790)
 Basilides (c. 117–138)
 Georges Bataille (1897–1962)
 Charles Batteux (1713–1780)
 Jean Baudrillard (1929–2007) 
 Bruno Bauer (1809–1882)
 David Baumgardt (1890–1963)
 Alexander Gottlieb Baumgarten (1714–1762)
 Pierre Bayle (1647–1706)
 Monroe Beardsley (1915–1985)
 James Beattie (1735–1803)
 Cesare, Marquis of Beccaria (1738–1794)
 Jakob Sigismund Beck (1761–1840)
 Vissarion Belinsky (1811–1848)
 Robert Bellarmine (1542–1621)
 Nuel Belnap (born 1930)
 Gustave Belot (1859–1929)
 Aaron Ben-Ze'ev (born 1949)
 David Benatar (born 1966)
 Dirk Benedict (born 1945)
 Friedrich Eduard Beneke (1798–1854)
 Walter Benjamin (1892–1940)
 Gottfried Benn (1886–1956)
 Jonathan Bennett (born 1930)
 Jeremy Bentham (1748–1832)
 Richard Bentley (1662–1742)
 Nikolai Berdyaev (1874–1948)
 Gustav Bergmann (1906–1987)
 Henri Bergson (1859–1941)
 George Berkeley (1685–1753)
 Isaiah Berlin (1909–1997)
 Claude Bernard (1813–1878)
 Bernard of Chartres (died 1130)
 Bernard of Clairvaux (1090–1153)
 Bernard Silvestris (or Bernard of Tours), (1147–1178)
 François Bernier (1620–1688)
 Eduard Bernstein (1850–1932)
 Ludwig von Bertalanffy (1901–1972)
 Bessarion (1403–1472)
 Bhartrhari (5th century)
 Gabriel Biel (1425–1495)
 Georg Bernhard Bilfinger (1693–1750)
 Alfred Binet (1857–1911)
 Ludwig Binswanger (1881–1966)
 Max Black (1909–1988)
 Simon Blackburn (born 1944)
 William Blackstone (1723–1780)
 Hugh Blair (1718–1800)
 William Blake (1757–1827)
 Maurice Blanchot (1907–2003)
 Brand Blanshard (1892–1987)
 Blasius of Parma (or Biagio Pelacani da Parma), (1345–1416)
 Ernst Bloch (1885–1977)
 Ned Block (born 1942)
 Maurice Blondel (1861–1949)
 Charles Blount (1654–1693)
 Norberto Bobbio (1909–2004)
 Jean Bodin (1530–1596)
 Anicius Manlius Severinus Boethius (AD 480–524/525)
 Boetius of Dacia (c. 1240–c. 1280)
 Leonardo Boff (born 1938)
 Alexander Bogdanov (1873–1928)
 Jakob Böhme (1575–1624)
 David Bohm (1917–1992)
 Niels Bohr (1885–1962)
 Nicolas Boileau-Despréaux (1636–1711)
 Samuel Bold (1649–1737)
 Henry St John, 1st Viscount Bolingbroke (1678–1751)
 Ludwig Boltzmann (1844–1906)
 Bernard Bolzano (1781–1848)
 Louis Gabriel Ambroise de Bonald (1754–1840)
 Francesco Bonatelli (1830–1911)
 Bonaventure (1221–1274)
 Dietrich Bonhoeffer (1906–1945)
 Charles Bonnet (1720–1793)
 George Boole (1815–1864) 
 Amadeo Bordiga (1889–1970)
 Bernard Bosanquet (1848–1923)
 Rudjer Boscovich (1711–1787)
 Pierre Bourdieu (1930–2002)
 Jacques-Bénigne Bossuet (1627–1704)
 Christopher Jacob Boström (1797–1866)
 Henri de Boulainvilliers (1658–1722)
 Emile Boutroux (1845–1921)
 Oets Kolk Bouwsma (1898–1978)
 Borden Parker Bowne (1847–1910)
 Robert Boyle (1627–1691)
 F. H. Bradley (1846–1924)
 Thomas Bradwardine (c. 1290–1349)
 Richard-Bevan Braithwaite (1900–1990)
 Richard B. Brandt (1910–1997)
 Franz Brentano (1838–1917)
 Percy Williams Bridgman (1882–1961)
 Edgar S. Brightman (1884–1953)
 Jean Anthelme Brillat-Savarin (1755–1826)
 Richard Brinkley (fl. 1350–1373)
 Radulphus Brito (c. 1270–c. 1320)
 C. D. Broad (1887–1971)
 David H.M. Brooks (1950–1996)
 Thom Brooks (born 1973)
 Luitzen Egbertus Jan Brouwer (1881–1966)
 Thomas Brown (1778–1820)
 Peter Browne (1666–1735)
 Orestes Brownson (1803–1876)
 Emil Brunner (1889–1966)
 Giordano Bruno (1548–1600)
 Leon Brunschvicg (1869–1944)
 James Bryce, 1st Viscount Bryce (1838–1922)
 Martin Buber (1878–1965)
 Justus Buchler (1914–1991)
 Ludwig Büchner (1824–1899)
 Henry Thomas Buckle (1821–1862)
 Malcolm Budd (born 1941)
 Johann Franz Buddeus (1667–1729)
 Buddhaghosa (5th century)
 Claude Buffier (1661–1737)
 Georges-Louis Leclerc, Comte de Buffon (1707–1788)
 Nikolai Bukharin (1888–1938)
 Sergei Nikolaevich Bulgakov (1871–1944)
 Edward Bullough (1880–1934)
 Rudolf Bultmann (1884–1976)
 Mario Bunge (1919–2020)
 Jacob Burckhardt (1818–1897)
 Tyler Burge (born 1946)
 Jean Buridan (1300–1358)
 Edmund Burke (1729–1797)
 Walter Burley (c. 1275–c. 1345)
 Myles Frederic Burnyeat (1939–2019)
 Richard Burthogge (1638–1704)
 Joseph Butler (1692–1752)
 Judith Butler (born 1956)
 Samuel Butler (1835–1902)

C

 Pierre Jean George Cabanis (1757–1808)
 Amílcar Cabral (1924–1973)
 Edward Caird (1835–1908)
 Dorion Cairns (1901–1973)
 Thomas Cajetan (1469–1534)
 Calcidius (4th century)
 Mario Calderoni (1879–1914)
 Callicles (late 5th century BC)
 John Calvin (1509–1564)
 Tommaso Campanella (1568–1639)
 George Campbell (1719–1796)
 Norman Robert Campbell (1880–1949)
 Albert Camus (1913–1960)
 Georges Canguilhem (1904–1995)
 Georg Cantor (1845–1918)
 Ángel Cappelletti (1927–1995)
 Johannes Capreolus (1380–1444)
 Claudia Card (1940–2015)
 Gerolamo Cardano (1501–1576)
 Thomas Carlyle (1795–1881)
 Gershom Carmichael (c. 1672 – 1729)
 Rudolf Carnap (1891–1970)
 Carneades (c. 214 – 129 BC)
 Edward Carpenter (1844–1929)
 Lewis Carroll (1832–1898)
 Nancy Cartwright (born 1943)
 Carl Gustav Carus (1789–1869)
 Paul Carus (1852–1919)
 Antonio Caso (1883–1946)
 Ernst Cassirer (1874–1945)
 Hector-Neri Castañeda (1924–1991)
 Cornelius Castoriadis (1922–1997)
 Carlo Cattaneo (1801–1869)
 Jean Cavaillès (1903–1944)
 Stanley Cavell (1926–2018)
 Margaret Cavendish (1623–1673)
 Celsus of Alexandria (2nd century)
 Michel de Certeau (1925–1986)
 Pyotr Chaadaev (1794–1856)
 Houston Stewart Chamberlain (1855–1927)
 Chanakya (or Kautilya) (321–296 BC)
 Chang Hsueh-ch'eng (or Zhang Xuecheng) (1738–1801)
 Chang Tsai (or Zhang Zai), (1020–1077)
 William Ellery Channing (1780–1842)
 Walter Charleton (1619–1707)
 Pierre Charron (1541–1603)
 François-René de Chateaubriand (1768–1848)
 Walter Chatton (1290–1343)
 Ch'en Hsien-chang (1428–1500)
 Cheng Hao (or Ch'eng Ming-Tao) (1032–1085)
 Cheng Hsuan (or Zheng Xuan) (127–200)
 Cheng Yi (or Ch'eng Yi Chu'an) (1033–1107)
 Nikolai Chernyshevsky (1828–1889)
 Chia Yi (or Jia Yi or Chia I) (201–169 BC)
 Chiao Hung (1540–1620)
 Boris Chicherin (1828–1904)
 Ch'ien Mu (1895–1990)
 Chih Tun (or Zhi Dun) (314–366)
 William Chillingworth (1602–1644)
 Roderick Chisholm (1916–1999)
 Noam Chomsky (born 1928)
 Tasan Chông Yagyong (1762–1836)
 Chou Tun-Yi (or Zhou Dunyi or Chou Lien-Hsi or Zhou Lianxi) (1017–1073)
 Christine de Pizan (c. 1365 – c. 1430)
 Chrysippus (279–207 BC)
 Thomas Chubb (1679–1747)
 Alonzo Church (1903–1995)
 Patricia Churchland (born 1943)
 Paul Churchland (born 1942)
 Leon Chwistek (1884–1944)
 Cicero (106 – 43 BC)
 August Cieszkowski (1814–1894)
 Emil Cioran (1911–1995)
 Hélène Cixous (born 1937)
 Clarembald of Arras (1110–1187)
 Samuel Clarke (1675–1729)
 Johannes Clauberg (1622–1665)
 Cleanthes (301–232 BC)
 Clement of Alexandria (2nd–3rd century)
 Catherine Clément (born 1939)
 Cleomedes (2nd century)
 William Kingdon Clifford (1845–1879)
 Catherine Trotter Cockburn (1679–1749)
 Lorraine Code (born 1937)
 G.A. Cohen (1941–2009)
 Hermann Cohen (1842–1918)
 L. Jonathan Cohen (1923–2006)
 Morris Raphael Cohen (1880–1947)
 Samuel Taylor Coleridge (1772–1834)
 John Colet (1466–1519)
 Lucio Colletti (1924–2001)
 Arthur Collier (1680–1732)
 R. G. Collingwood (1889–1943)
 Anthony Collins (1676–1729)
 John Comenius (1592–1670)
 Auguste Comte (1798–1857)
 Étienne Bonnot de Condillac (1715–1780)
 Marquis de Condorcet (1743–1794)
 Confucius (551 – 479 BC)
 Benjamin Constant (1767–1830)
 Lady Anne Finch Conway (1631–1679)
 Anna J. Cooper (1858–1964)
 Nicolaus Copernicus (1473–1543)
 Henry Corbin (1903–1978)
 Geraud de Cordemoy (1626–1684)
 Moses ben Jacob Cordovero (1522–1570)
 Carlos Cossio (1903–1987)
 Newton da Costa (born 1929)
 Uriel da Costa (1585–1640)
 Antoine Augustin Cournot (1801–1877)
 Victor Cousin (1792–1867)
 Louis Couturat (1868–1914)
 Crates of Thebes (c. 365 – c. 285 BC) 
 William Crathorn (14th century)
 Cratylus (c. 400 BC)
 James Edwin Creighton (1861–1924)
 Hasdai Crescas (c. 1340–1410)
 Benedetto Croce (1866–1952)
 Alexander Crummell (1819–1898)
 Christian August Crusius (1715–1775)
 Ralph Cudworth (1617–1688)
 Nathaniel Culverwel (1619–1651)
 Richard Cumberland (1631?–1718)
 Cyrano de Bergerac (1619–1655)
 Heinrich Czolbe (1819–1873)

List of philosophers
 (A–C)
 (D–H)
 (I–Q)
 (R–Z)

Notes

 

sl:Seznam filozofov